Alexander Fischer (born 16 September 1986) is a retired Danish professional footballer who played as a right-back and current manager of Skive IK. He has been used more as a winger after he moved to Randers FC. In Lyngby he was used as a full back.

References

External links
 
 

1986 births
Living people
Danish men's footballers
People from Rudersdal Municipality
Association football defenders
Lyngby Boldklub players
Viborg FF players
Randers FC players
Skive IK players
Danish Superliga players
Danish 1st Division players
Sportspeople from the Capital Region of Denmark
Danish football managers
Skive IK managers